Ignatius House may refer to:

 Ignatius Jesuit Centre, Guelph, Canada
 Ignatius House, a Jesuit spirituality centre at De Krijtberg, Amsterdam, Netherlands
 Squire Ignatius Haskell House, Maine, United States
 Ignatius Eckert House, Minnesota, United States
Villa St Ignatius, Sliema, Malta

See also
 Ignatius of Loyola
 Ignatius of Antioch